Emelia Brobbey (born 6 January 1982) is Ghanaian actress, television presenter and musician. She won the Best Indigenous Actress of the Year and was nominated for Best Supporting Actress of the Year at the City People Entertainment Awards in 2016. She won Best Gallywood Actress and Best Philanthropist at the 3G  Awards in New York in 2018. She won the 2019 Best Actor Female indigenous at the ZAFAA Global Award which was presented by the African Film Academy Awards.

Early life and education 
Emelia Brobbey was born on January 6, 1982, and grew up in Akyem Swedru  in the Eastern region of Ghana. She completed Akyem Swedru Secondary School and continued to Presbyterian Teacher's Training College. After completing Teacher's Certificate 'A'. Emelia was posted to teach at Obuasi were she taught Agric Science. She was then introduced into acting. She also holds a diploma in Journalism, a bachelor's degree in Human Resource Management and an ICM certificate in Broadcast Journalism.

Music 
She released her first single  " Fa me ko"  in 2019. The song was heavily criticised for the poor vocals of Emelia. January 2020 she released her second single "Odo Electric"

Achievement 
In March 2021, she was appointed as an ambassador for the COVID-19 National Trust Fund.

Filmography 

 Asantewaa
 Asem Asa
 Adofoasa
 Seed Of Rejection
 Kae
 Nkonyaa
 Pains of True Love
 Medimafo Tease
 Kofi Sika
 Mansa, The Pretty Crying Baby
 Games of the Heart

Personal life 
In 2010, Emelia married Dr Kofi Adu Boateng who is the  founder of End Point Homeopathy Clinic but the couple divorced in 2012. She is currently a single mother with two Kids. Her first son was born while she was in school training to become a teacher. Her second son was from her marriage with doctor Kofi and was born on 13 June 2013.

References 

Living people
Ghanaian film actresses
21st-century Ghanaian actresses
People from Eastern Region (Ghana)
1982 births